Adolf Seger (born 2 January 1945 in Freiburg im Breisgau) is a German former wrestler who competed in the 1972 Summer Olympics and in the 1976 Summer Olympics.
In the Ringer veterans (Masters) he got ten times the world champion title.

Personal career

Adolf Seger comes from a wrestling loving family: his father and his five brothers were all active as a wrestler. His first wrestling lessons received the five-year-old Adolf by his father. Its sporty role model was his older brother Edmund, who fought in the German national Ringer at the Summer Olympic Games in Rome in 1960.

Adolf Seger is married and father of three. Over 40 years he worked as a postman at Deutsche Post AG in Zahringen; Since January 2010 he is retired. He sits in his spare time for local politics, charity and the promotion of sports. Seger is still athletic fit and active: When table tennis, cycling and strength training. So he is still well trained as ever and still keeps his competition weight. Adolf Seger is in his club AV Germania St. Georgen still available as a training partner and coach.

Sports career

Adolf Seger started in freestyle (Welter and Middleweight), and he was frequently a German, European and world champion. Among his greatest successes were also the medal gains at the Summer Olympic Games in Munich in 1972 and the Summer Olympic Games in Montreal in 1976. Seger is considered one of Germany's best wrestlers of all time. Particular, he has further developed the fighting techniques on the ground by his talent for movement. With the Seger-grip named after him, he has achieved numerous victories shoulder.

Adolf Seger had major health problems as a young wrestler. In the mid-1960s he was afflicted not only in the typical wrestler "cauliflower ear", but also to shoulder, back and knee injuries. During this time, Seger was in constant treatment at the University Hospital Freiburg. The injury delayed his international sports career by several years. Nevertheless, Seger put an enormous diligence exercise on the day and put it back even his professional training.

Seger's power and athleticism were among the best in the world wrestling sport. The strenuous training and "make weight" before competitions Seger moved in 1975 to switch from the Welter- into the middleweight.

Although on the wrestling mat very consistent and ambitious, Adolf Seger has always been committed to a clean and fair sport. Not for nothing, he was awarded the Fair Play Trophy. He has always remained loyal to his Freiburg Ringer club: to wrestle offers for other clubs, Seger has not accepted.

In the 1990s and 2000s was Adolf Seger ten times Freestyle World Champion Wrestler at the Veterans (Masters); this is unmatched worldwide. His result obtained for this prize of 15,000 U.S. dollars donated Seger of child cancer.

German Championships
Note: all the competitions in free style, OS = Olympic Games, WM = World Championship, EM = European Championship, welterweight, and 74 kg middleweight, to 82 kg body weight

References

1945 births
Living people
Olympic wrestlers of West Germany
Wrestlers at the 1972 Summer Olympics
Wrestlers at the 1976 Summer Olympics
German male sport wrestlers
Olympic bronze medalists for West Germany
Olympic medalists in wrestling
Medalists at the 1976 Summer Olympics
Medalists at the 1972 Summer Olympics
Sportspeople from Freiburg im Breisgau
21st-century German people
20th-century German people